Joseph Marello Institute is a private catholic high school located at P. Burgos St., Poblacion, San Juan, Batangas. It is managed by the Oblates of St. Joseph, a congregation founded by St. Joseph Marello. Its school ID number is 401650.

Footnotes

External links 

 Official Website of Oblates of Saint Joseph Schools

High schools in Batangas